Leroy Seat (born August 15, 1938) is a former chancellor (1996–2004) of Seinan Gakuin and full-time faculty member of Seinan Gakuin University (1968–2004) in Fukuoka, Japan. He was a Baptist missionary to Japan from 1966 to 2004 and now lives in his home state of Missouri, where he conducts his public activities under the auspices of 4-L Ministries.

Seat is the founder and former president of the Seinan Gakuin 4-L Foundation, Inc., a non-profit organization seeking to help Seinan Gakuin fulfill its mission through supporting and enhancing the presence and witness of Christian teachers and other Christian workers at Seinan Gakuin.

4-L Publications has published the following books by Seat:

** Fed Up with Fundamentalism: A Historical, Theological, and Personal Appraisal of Christian Fundamentalism (2007; rev. ed., 2020)

** The Limits of Liberalism: A Historical, Theological, and Personal Appraisal of Christian Liberalism (2010; rev. ed., 2020)

** Thirty True Things Everyone Needs to Know Now (2018)

** A Wonderful Life: The Story of My Life from Birth until My 82nd Birthday (1938~2020) (2020)

Seat regularly makes blog posts at The View from This Seat. His personal website is found at https://www.4-LMinistries.net/, and information about his books can be found there.

References

1938 births
Living people
American theologians
Baptist missionaries from the United States
Baptist missionaries in Japan
Missionary educators
American expatriates in Japan
Academic staff of Seinan Gakuin University